The Traditional Anglican Church (TAC), formerly the Traditional Anglican Communion, is an international church consisting of national provinces in the continuing Anglican movement, independent of the Anglican Communion and the Archbishop of Canterbury. The TAC upholds the theological doctrines of the Affirmation of St. Louis. Each of the respective jurisdictions utilizes a traditional Book of Common Prayer deemed to be free of theological deviation. Most parishioners of these churches would be described as being traditional Prayer Book Anglicans in their theology and liturgical practice. Some Anglo-Catholic parishes use the Anglican Missal in their liturgies. The TAC is governed by a college of bishops from across the church and headed by an elected primate.

The TAC was formed in 1991. Archbishop Louis Falk was its first primate. He was succeeded in 2002 by Archbishop John Hepworth of the Anglican Catholic Church in Australia. The current primate is Archbishop Shane Janzen of the Anglican Catholic Church of Canada.

TAC member churches were established outside the Anglican Communion over a number of different issues; the principal issue has been the ordination of women. Other issues include liturgical revisions, the acceptance of homosexual activity and the importance of apostolic tradition within the church.

History 

In 1991, the then Traditional Anglican Communion was formed to create a united communion of Continuing Anglican churches, which originated in the Affirmation of St. Louis, which repudiated the revision of the Book of Common Prayer, in addition to other issues, such as the ordination of women. With the beginning of the 21st century, "the communion reported 14 member churches with a total of 300,000 members spread over six continents."

In October 2007 the bishops of TAC formally expressed the desire to enter into full unity with the See of Rome without losing core Anglican distinctives. The full petition accepted the ministry of the Bishop of Rome and the Catechism of the Catholic Church. The Vatican's Congregation for the Doctrine of the Faith stated, on 5 July 2008, that it was giving serious consideration to the prospect of corporate union with groups of Anglicans and on 29 October 2009 the Congregation for the Doctrine of the Faith announced Pope Benedict XVI's intention to create a new type of ecclesiastical structure, called a personal ordinariate, for unspecified groups of Anglicans entering into full communion with the See of Rome. 

On 4 November 2009, Pope Benedict signed the apostolic constitution, Anglicanorum coetibus, which was released on 9 November 2009 and on 3 March 2010, in Orlando, Florida, the eight members of the house of bishops of the Anglican Church in America — the United States branch of the TAC — voted unanimously to formally ask the Holy See to be accepted as a personal ordinariate. 

On 17 March 2010, leaders of the Canadian branch of the TAC (the Anglican Catholic Church of Canada) decided to do the same. The TAC member churches in the United Kingdom and Australia also petitioned for the formation of respective ordinariates. 

On 1 March 2012, the TAC College of Bishops announced the acceptance, with immediate effect, of Archbishop Hepworth's resignation as primate and the appointment of Archbishop Samuel Prakash as acting primate. The college of bishops also made it known that the TAC would not be accepting the offer made to Anglicans by the Holy See. 

On October 14, 2016, the college of bishops elected Archbishop Shane B. Janzen as the third primate of the Traditional Anglican Communion. The new constitution of the Traditional Anglican Church, which reconstitutes the worldwide Traditional Anglican Communion into the global Traditional Anglican Church, was adopted and ratified in March 2020. 

On 16 February 2022, it was announced that the TAC has entered into an agreement of full sacramental communion (communio in sacris) with the Anglican Province of America.

Provinces
At present the Traditional Anglican Church consists of 10 Provinces and various Dioceses:

Africa:
Anglican Church in Southern Africa
Continuing Anglican Church of Zambia
Continuing Anglican Church in Zimbabwe

Americas:
Anglican Church in America
Anglican Catholic Church of Canada
Traditional Anglican Church - Latin American Province

Asia:
Anglican Church of India 

Europe:
Traditional Anglican Church in Britain
Church of Ireland - Traditional Rite

Oceania:
Anglican Catholic Church in Australia
Church of the Torres Strait

References

External links

Anglo-Catholicism
Christian organizations established in 1991
Continuing Anglican denominations